Akhamb Island is a small island in Vanuatu, just off the southcoast of Malakula.

It has around 646 inhabitants, according to the 2009 census.

References

Islands of Vanuatu
Malampa Province